The Alon A-4 is a prototype American light aircraft of the 1960s. Alon INC. of McPherson, Kansas was formed by two former executives of Beechcraft in 1963 and had initially built an improved version of the ERCO Ercoupe as the Alon A-2. In 1964, Alon started  design of an all-new four-seat light aircraft, the Alon Four (or Alon A-4). It was a conventional, singled-engined low-winged monoplane of all-metal construction with a fixed (non retractable) tricycle landing gear undercarriage. Alon produced one prototype, this first flying on February 25, 1966. The aircraft was never put into full production before the company was sold to Mooney aircraft.

Specifications

References 

 Taylor, John W. R. Jane's All The World's Aircraft 1966–67. London:Sampson Low, Marston & Company, 1966.
 ref. see image of flier
 Alon X-A4 data 

1960s United States civil utility aircraft
Aircraft first flown in 1966
Low-wing aircraft
Single-engined tractor aircraft